Matt Scott (born March 27, 1985) is an American wheelchair basketball player.

Biography
Matt Scott was born in Detroit, Michigan, where he began playing wheelchair basketball with the Sterling Heights Challengers in the NWBA Junior Division. As a high schooler, he was on the gold medal-winning US team at the 2007 Parapan American Games in Brazil, where he was coached by Tracy Chynoweth, head coach of University of Wisconsin-Whitewater's college wheelchair basketball team. Scott played five years for the UW-Whitewater Warhawks in the NWBA College Division, winning championships three out of five years in 2004, 2005, and 2007. During his time at Whitewater, he competed in the 2004 Summer Paralympics and 2008 Summer Paralympics. He also won a silver medal at IWBF World Championship in 2006 in Amsterdam. He was nominated for the Best Male Athlete with a Disability ESPY Award in 2008. After college, Scott played professionally for Galatasaray S.K. in Istanbul, Turkey for six seasons from 2008 to 2014. In 2012, Matt Scott helped Team USA to a bronze medal in their 61–46 victory over Great Britain.

Scott continued his professional career with Comune Di Porto Torres in Italy for two seasons from 2014 to 2016, during which time Scott's game film of him making multiple three-point shots in front of a crowded arena went viral, prompting the sports blog The Undefeated to publish a write-up titled "Meet the Steph Curry of Wheelchair Basketball." Whistle Sports also shared the game film, which has garnered over 2.5M views on Facebook. Scott left Italy to play three seasons with the RSB Thuringia Bulls in Exleben, Germany. He competed in the 2016 Summer Paralympics, where Team USA defeated Spain 68–52 to win Team USA's first gold medal since 1988. Scott then returned to RSB Thuringia where he and Team USA teammate Jake Williams helped the Bulls win the IWBF Champions Cup in 2018 and 2019. In November 2018, Scott fell ill and contracted sepsis, leading to months-long hospitalization during which time he went into a coma for two weeks. He later recovered and returned to playing, but credits the episode for putting his life and basketball career in perspective.

During the COVID-19 pandemic, when it was uncertain whether the German RBBL would execute a season, Scott signed with CP Mideba in Badajoz, Spain. In 2021, he competed in the Tokyo Paralympic Games and helped secure a repeat gold medal for the United States in a 64–60 victory over Japan. Matt now resides in the Bay Area.

Scott is one of the most sought-after wheelchair basketball players by well-known brands. He was the first US Paralympian to star in a Nike, Inc. advertisement, "No Excuses", where the viewer is made unaware of his disability until the camera zooms out to show his basketball wheelchair at the end. Scott has also been a spokesperson for Travel Wisconsin, participated in a digital marketing campaign for the Apple Watch, and has been an athlete ambassador for Ralph Lauren.

References

External links
 
 

1985 births
Living people
American men's wheelchair basketball players
Galatasaray S.K. (wheelchair basketball) players
People with spina bifida
Basketball players from Detroit
University of Wisconsin–Whitewater alumni
Wheelchair category Paralympic competitors
Paralympic wheelchair basketball players of the United States
Paralympic gold medalists for the United States
Paralympic bronze medalists for the United States
Paralympic medalists in wheelchair basketball
Wheelchair basketball players at the 2004 Summer Paralympics
Wheelchair basketball players at the 2008 Summer Paralympics
Wheelchair basketball players at the 2012 Summer Paralympics
Wheelchair basketball players at the 2016 Summer Paralympics
Wheelchair basketball players at the 2020 Summer Paralympics
Medalists at the 2012 Summer Paralympics
Medalists at the 2016 Summer Paralympics
Medalists at the 2020 Summer Paralympics
21st-century American people